Gruppenbach may refer to:

Gruppenbach (Schozach), a river of Baden-Württemberg, Germany, tributary of the Schozach
Gruppenbach (Bühler), a river of Baden-Württemberg, Germany, tributary of the Bühler